"Empty Space" is a song by British singer James Arthur. The song was released as a digital download and for streaming on 19 October 2018 by Columbia Records as the second single from Arthur's third studio album, You. The song was written by Arthur along with Richard Boardman, Pablo Bowman, Nick Gate and produced by Dan Priddy, Mark Crew and Digital Farm Animals.  As of 2021, it has sold 534,441 copies in the UK.

Background
Talking about the song, Arthur said, "This song is for anyone who has ever deeply loved and lost someone dear to them, and is then faced with the struggle of trying to fill that void. It is about coming to terms with the fact that only that special person can truly fill the empty space."

Music video
A music video to accompany the release of "Empty Space" was first released onto YouTube on 1 November 2018. The video features actor Tom Felton.

Live performances
 The X Factor (4 November 2018)

Track listings

Charts

Certifications

Release history

References

2018 singles
2018 songs
James Arthur songs
Songs written by Digital Farm Animals
Songs written by James Arthur
Songs written by Richard Boardman
Songs written by Pablo Bowman

Song recordings produced by Digital Farm Animals